Engaged may refer to:

 Engaged (play), an 1877 play by W. S. Gilbert
 "Engaged" (song), a 2008 song by Alisa Mizuki
 Engaged Buddhism refers to Buddhists who are seeking ways to apply the insights from meditation practice and dharma teachings
 Engaged column, an architectural feature
 Engaged and underage, a 2007 American reality television series on MTV
 Engaged tone, a busy signal
 Engaged Spirituality refers to engaging in the world to transform it in positive ways guided by spiritual beliefs
 Engaged theory is a methodological framework for understanding social complexity

See also

 Engage (disambiguation)
 Engagement (disambiguation)
 Disengage (disambiguation)
 Disengagement (disambiguation)